The men's sport sambo 52 kilograms competition at the 2018 Asian Games in Jakarta was held on 31 August 2018 at the Jakarta Convention Center Assembly Hall.

Schedule
All times are Western Indonesia Time (UTC+07:00)

Results
Legend
DQ — Won by disqualification
SU — Won by submission
WO — Won by walkover

Main bracket

Final

Top half

Bottom half

Repechage

References

External links
Official website

Sambo at the 2018 Asian Games